Tonya Kinzinger is an American dancer, model and actress who has attained fame in France.

Biography
Kinzinger was born on 20 June 1968 in Monroe, Michigan. She began dancing at three years old, when her mother enrolled her in tap dancing lessons, and became passionate about ballet dancing at the age of six. Several years later, she left Michigan to study at a well known dance school in New York. Scouted by a photographer, Kinzinger joined a modelling agency and worked as a model in Paris. She returned to the US to finish high school before moving to France to pursue a career in acting.

She appeared in the film Dancing Machine with Alain Delon. She then played Jessica in the TV series Sous le soleil (Under the Sun), from 1996 to 2008, for which she is best known in France. In 2006, she appeared in two episodes of the series The Bold and the Beautiful in Los Angeles. In 2007, she also launched a fashion collection called "Tonya - K." in collaboration with Christophe Lebo. She played Sally in the movie Fool Moon, directed by Jérôme L'Hotsky,  which was filmed in Britain in July and August 2007. Kinzinger acted in  Dreams, a series broadcast on the French television network NRJ 12. In 2011, after meeting Stéphane Slima on the set of Sous le soleil, she acted in the play Le Président, sa femme et moi. (The President, His Wife, and Me). In 2012, she hosted season 9 of Star Academy on the NRJ 12 network. In 2014, she was a contestant on Danse avec les stars 5 and reached the semifinals.

Kinzinger married Bernard Lignon on 27 December 1998. They have one son Sacha, born in 2003.

Danse avec les stars

In 2014, she participated in the fifth season of Danse avec les stars – the French version of Dancing with the Stars. She was partnered with professional dancer Maxime Dereymez. On November 15, 2014, they were eliminated finishing 5th out of 11 contestants. 

During 5th week, each contestant change partner for The week and Tonya Kinzinger got in couple with Guillaume Foucault instead of Maxime Dereymez.

Filmography

References

1968 births
Living people
People from Monroe, Michigan
Actresses from Michigan
American film actresses
20th-century French actresses
American emigrants to France
21st-century French actresses
French film actresses